Stephen Wagner (born January 17, 1977) is a Canadian former professional ice hockey goaltender who played three seasons for the Wichita Thunder in the Central Hockey League (CHL). He was selected by the St. Louis Blues in the 6th round (159th overall) of the 1996 NHL Entry Draft.

Awards and honours

References

External links

1977 births
Canadian ice hockey goaltenders
Denver Pioneers men's ice hockey players
Fort Wayne Komets players
Ice hockey people from Alberta
Living people
Sportspeople from Red Deer, Alberta
St. Louis Blues draft picks
Wichita Thunder players